The Highland Amateur Cup is an annual football cup competition run by the Highland Executive branch of the Scottish Amateur Football Association. It also covers various offshore islands.
All teams affiliated to Highland Associations are eligible to enter; and so this competition covers one of the largest geographical areas for any district amateur cup competition in the UK. 

Currently, the Associations affiliated to the Highland Amateur Cup are: 
   
 Caithness AFA 
 North West Sutherland AFA  
 Inverness and District FA
 Skye & Lochalsh AFA 
 Lewis & Harris FA 
 Uist & Barra AFA 
 Orkney AFA 

Shetland FA clubs are eligible to take part, but due to travel distances, have rarely entered the competition.

History

Pentland United are the most successful club, having won the competition eight times.

Western Isles teams
The 1984 tournament was the first time a team from the Western Isles was allowed to enter, and Ness' cup-run culminated in a 4–1 victory over Bishopmill Villa at Victoria Park, Dingwall. Ness have won the competition on three other occasions; 1991, 1992 and 1995. 

Back, who also compete in the Lewis and Harris Football League, won the cup in 2004.

Lochs (2003 and 2005) and Point (1994) are the other Lewis and Harris Football League teams to have won the cup, while Stornoway Athletic have been runners-up on two occasions (1990 and 2003). Carloway also finished runners-up in 2014.

Finals from 2007–2012

Past winners

* Won on penalties

Performance by Club 
This table features runner-up information, only where known.

References 

Football cup competitions in Scotland
Football in Highland (council area)
Football in Orkney
Football in Shetland
Football in the Outer Hebrides
Amateur association football in Scotland
1978 establishments in Scotland
Recurring sporting events established in 1978